Caloundra is a Legislative Assembly of Queensland electoral district on the Sunshine Coast in the Australian state of Queensland. The electorate is centred on the city of Caloundra and stretches north to Wurtulla, south to Pelican Waters and west to the Bruce Highway.

The seat was held by Mark McArdle, the first deputy leader of the Liberal National Party from 2008 to 2009, and prior to that state Liberal leader from November 2007 to July 2008. McArdle succeeded former Liberal leader Joan Sheldon upon her retirement in 2004. On 27 June 2019, McArdle announced he would retire from politics at the 2020 state election. The seat was won by Labor's Jason Hunt at the 2020 election.

Members for Caloundra

Election results

References

External links
 Electorate profile (Antony Green, ABC)

Caloundra
Sunshine Coast, Queensland
Caloundra